Nemacheilus tebo is a species of ray-finned fish in the genus Nemacheilus from  Kalimantan Timur in Indonesia.

Footnotes 
 

T
Fish described in 2009